The University of Central Florida College of Graduate Studies is an academic college of the University of Central Florida located in Orlando, Florida, United States. The college confers most professional and research master's degrees and doctoral degrees in various fields of study for the university. The departments under which instruction and research take place are housed in UCF's other schools and colleges. The administrative offices for the College of Graduate Studies are located in Millican Hall, on UCF's main campus. The interim dean of the college is Ross Hinkle, Ph.D.

Originally called the Division of Graduate Studies, in August 2008 the UCF Board of Trustees changed the name to "College of Graduate Studies" to better reflect the school's responsibilities for graduate education. Since 2008, the dean of the College of Graduate Studies has concurrently held the title of vice provost. This dual title is in recognition of the role played by the dean in reviewing academic departments and graduate programs throughout the university.

For decades, the Division of Graduate Studies was housed in Colbourn Hall, which now includes the Graduate Student Center – a social, study, presentation, and research area for graduate students. The College of Graduate Studies does not have a faculty. The graduate faculty consists of members of the university faculty – organized in their colleges into "fields" representing distinct subject areas – who have been so designated by their respective departments or schools and approved by the dean of the College of Graduate Studies. Students apply for admission to a specific field, although once admitted, students are not limited to that field when selecting courses or faculty to serve of the committee supervising the student's research. The College of Medicine confers M.D.'s, but not Ph.D. degrees. The college offers 120 graduate degrees options. UCF ranks third among Florida's state universities in total graduate enrollment.

Degrees

College of Graduate Studies

Doctorates
Doctor of Philosophy (Ph.D.) 

Arts and Humanities:
Texts and Technology
Business Administration:
Business Administration
Education and Human Performance:
Education
Engineering and Computer Science:
Civil Engineering, Computer Engineering, Computer Science, Electrical Engineering, Environmental Engineering, Industrial Engineering, Materials Science and Engineering, Mechanical Engineering
Interdisciplinary:
Biomedical Sciences, Modeling and Simulation
Health and Public Affairs:
Criminal Justice, Public Affairs
Hospitality Management:
Hospitality Management
Nursing:
Nursing
Optics and Photonics:
Optics and Photonics
Sciences:
Applied and Human Factors Psychology, Chemistry, Clinical Psychology, Conservation Biology, Industrial and Organization Psychology, Mathematics, Physics, Security Studies, Scoiology

Doctor of Education (Ed.D.)
Doctor of Nursing Practice (DNP)
Doctor of Physical Therapy (D.P.T.)

Conferred by related UCF colleges
Doctor of Medicine (M.D.) (College of Medicine)

Specialist degrees
Education specialist (Ed.S.)

Master's degrees
Master of Arts (M.A.)
Master of Arts in Teaching (M.A.T.)
Master of Business Administration (M.B.A., MSBM)
Master of Education (M.Ed.)
Master of Engineering (M.Eng., MSEE, MSEM, MSEnvE, MSMSE, MSCpE, MSCE, MSAE)
Master of Fine Arts (M.F.A.)
Master of Nonprofit Management (M.N.M.)
Master of Public Administration (M.P.A.)
Master in Research Administration (MRA)
Master of Science (M.S.)
Master of Science in Industrial Engineering (M.S.I.E.)
Master of Science in Nursing (M.S.N.)
Master of Science in Management Studies (M.S.M.S.)
Master of Social Work (M.S.W.)
Professional Science Master's (PSM)

Graduate certificates
Offered in multiple programs

References

External links
UCF College of Graduate Studies
University of Central Florida Official Website

Graduate Studies
Educational institutions established in 2008
2008 establishments in Florida